Çevlik is a village in Mezitli district  of Mersin Province, Turkey. (Mezitli district center is a part of Greater Mersin). The population of the village was 337 as of 2012.

References

Villages in Mezitli District